The meridian 114° east of Greenwich is a line of longitude that extends from the North Pole across the Arctic Ocean, Asia, the Indian Ocean, Australasia, the Southern Ocean, and Antarctica to the South Pole.

The 114th meridian east forms a great circle with the 66th meridian west.

From Pole to Pole
Starting at the North Pole and heading south to the South Pole, the 114th meridian east passes through:

{| class="wikitable plainrowheaders"
! scope="col" width="130" | Co-ordinates
! scope="col" | Country, territory or sea
! scope="col" | Notes
|-
| style="background:#b0e0e6;" | 
! scope="row" style="background:#b0e0e6;" | Arctic Ocean
| style="background:#b0e0e6;" |
|-valign="top"
| style="background:#b0e0e6;" | 
! scope="row" style="background:#b0e0e6;" | Laptev Sea
| style="background:#b0e0e6;" | Passing just east of the Taymyr Peninsula, Krasnoyarsk Krai,  (at )
|-valign="top"
| 
! scope="row" | 
| Sakha Republic Irkutsk Oblast — from  Republic of Buryatia — from  Zabaykalsky Krai — from  Republic of Buryatia — from  Zabaykalsky Krai — from 
|-
| 
! scope="row" | 
|
|-valign="top"
| 
! scope="row" | 
| Inner Mongolia Hebei – from  Inner Mongolia – from  Shanxi – from  Hebei − for about 14 km from  Shanxi – from  Hebei – from  Shanxi – from  Hebei – from  Henan – from  Hubei – from  Jiangxi − for about 20 km from  Hunan – from  Jiangxi – from  Hunan – from  Jiangxi − from  Guangdong − from 
|-
| 
! scope="row" | 
| Mainland and Lantau Island
|-
| style="background:#b0e0e6;" | 
! scope="row" style="background:#b0e0e6;" | South China Sea
| style="background:#b0e0e6;" | Passing through the disputed Spratly Islands
|-
| 
! scope="row" | 
| Sarawak – on the island of Borneo
|-
| 
! scope="row" | 
| Island of BorneoWest KalimantanEast KalimantanCentral Kalimantan
|-
| style="background:#b0e0e6;" | 
! scope="row" style="background:#b0e0e6;" | Java Sea
| style="background:#b0e0e6;" |
|-
| 
! scope="row" | 
| Island of Madura
|-
| style="background:#b0e0e6;" | 
! scope="row" style="background:#b0e0e6;" | Madura Strait
| style="background:#b0e0e6;" |
|-
| 
! scope="row" | 
| Island of Java
|-
| style="background:#b0e0e6;" | 
! scope="row" style="background:#b0e0e6;" | Indian Ocean
| style="background:#b0e0e6;" |
|-
| 
! scope="row" | 
| Western Australia
|-
| style="background:#b0e0e6;" | 
! scope="row" style="background:#b0e0e6;" | Shark Bay
| style="background:#b0e0e6;" |
|-
| 
! scope="row" | 
| Western Australia
|-
| style="background:#b0e0e6;" | 
! scope="row" style="background:#b0e0e6;" | Indian Ocean
| style="background:#b0e0e6;" |
|-
| style="background:#b0e0e6;" | 
! scope="row" style="background:#b0e0e6;" | Southern Ocean
| style="background:#b0e0e6;" |
|-
| 
! scope="row" | Antarctica
| Australian Antarctic Territory, claimed by 
|-
|}

e114 meridian east